Thomas Legh FRS ( – 8 May 1857) was a politician in England.

Born about 1793 he was the oldest illegitimate son and heir of Thomas Peter Legh. He was educated at Brasenose College, Oxford.

Thomas Legh travelled after leaving Oxford, he was in Egypt in 1812 and 1813 and published an account of his journey in 1816.

He was Member of Parliament (MP) for the rotten borough of Newton in Lancashire from 16 April 1814, presumably this was the date he came of age, until the borough was disenfranchised at the 1832 general election.

He married twice, firstly on 14 January 1828 to Ellen Turner (who had previously been abducted at the age of 15). They had one son who predeceased his father and one daughter. Ellen died in childbirth in 1831. His second marriage on 3 October 1843 was to  
Maud Lowther; they had no children.

In 1830 he was one of the initial proprietors of the Wigan Branch Railway.

Thomas Legh made his nephew, William John Legh, his successor, William later became Baron Newton. Thomas Legh died on 8 May 1857.

Notes

References

External links 
 

1790s births
1857 deaths
Members of the Parliament of the United Kingdom for English constituencies
UK MPs 1812–1818
UK MPs 1818–1820
UK MPs 1820–1826
UK MPs 1826–1830
UK MPs 1830–1831
UK MPs 1831–1832
Fellows of the Royal Society